St George's Church is the only English speaking  Anglican congregation in Lisbon, Portugal. It is located at Rua São Jorge 6, north of the Estrela Garden.

History
In 1654 a treaty between Lord Protector Oliver Cromwell of England and King John IV of Portugal (signed on his behalf by João Rodrigues de Sá e Menezes, Count of Penaguião) allowed English residents in Portugal to "profess their own Religion in private houses... and that finally a Place be allowed for them to bury their dead". A chaplaincy was established, with services held in the home of the British Envoy.

Cemetery

Although a burial ground had been promised by the 1654 treaty, implementation was thwarted by the Portuguese Inquisition.  Land was finally leased in 1717; the first burial was that of Francis La Roche, a Huguenot refugee, who died in 1724.

Notable burials in the cemetery include the tombs of the writer Henry Fielding, of hymn-writer Philip Doddridge, of merchant David de Pury, astronomer Carl Ludwig Christian Rümker, Field Marshal of the Portuguese land army Christian August, Prince of Waldeck and Pyrmont and diplomat Thomas Barclay.

The cemetery includes 31 Commonwealth War Graves: five from the First World War and 26 from the Second. 29 are in individual plots; two are in private family vaults. They include members of the British Army, Royal Navy, Royal Air Force, Royal Canadian Air Force, Merchant Navy and British Overseas Airways Corporation.

Count Miklós Horthy, a Calvinist former Vice Admiral in the Austro-Hungarian Navy and Regent of Hungary, died in exile in Portugal and was buried in the cemetery, along with his wife and son. In 1993 they were exhumed, and re-interred in the Horthy family mausoleum in Kenderes.

Church building
Anglicans in Portugal petitioned for permission to build a church, but until the early 19th century the Portuguese Inquisition prevailed on the monarch not to grant it. A church of St George the Martyr was built in the cemetery in 1822. That church was consecrated in 1843 but was damaged by earthquake in 1859. It was rebuilt, but burnt down in 1886. The present church was designed by the London-based architects John Medland and Charles Edward Powell and consecrated in 1889. It is a Romanesque Revival building with a narthex, blind arcades and rose window on its west front. The windows are by Lavers & Westlake.

Anglican Church of St George and St Paul, Lisbon
In 1984, St George's Church, Lisbon was amalgamated with St Paul's Church, Estoril to form the Greater Lisbon Chaplaincy, and is part of the Diocese in Europe of the Church of England. It is now named the Anglican Church of St George and St Paul, Lisbon.

Chaplains

Chaplains of St George's
In the early years there were many long periods of interregnum. The last of these was from 1800 to 1812, due to the Peninsular War.

Zachary Cradock, 1656 to 1660, subsequently Provost of Eton
Thomas Marsden, 1661 to 1663
Michael Geddes, 1678 to 1688, subsequently Chancellor of Salisbury Cathedral
John Colbatch, 1688 to 1698, subsequently Knightbridge Professor of Philosophy at Cambridge
Jonathan Swift, appointed 1702, but never went to Lisbon; subsequently well known as a satirist, and Dean of St Patrick's Cathedral, Dublin
Joseph Wilcocks, 1709 to 1714, subsequently Bishop of Gloucester and then concurrently Bishop of Rochester and Dean of Westminster
Joseph Simms, 1721–1734, subsequently Prebendary of Lincoln Cathedral and St Paul's Cathedral
Staveley Parker, 1743 to 1749
John Williamson, 1749 to 1763
William Allen, 1763 to 1782
Herbert Hill, 1782 to 1800
Robert Marrat Miller, 1812 to 1818
Thomas Hurford Siely, 1819 to 1840
George Sayle Prior, 1841 to 1861
Thomas Kenworthy Brown, 1861 to 1867
Thomas Godfrey Pembroke Pope, 1867 to 1902, invited to become the bishop of the Lusitanian Church in 1889, but which he declined
William Hawkesley Westall, 1902 to 1907
Edward Pilcher Lewis, 1907 to 1915
Joseph Henry Morton Nodder, 1915 to 1924
Charles James Hamilton Dobson, 1925 to 1930
Cyril Gerald Holland, 1930 to 1935
Herbert Pentin, 1936 to 1937
Harry Frank Fulford Williams, 1937 to 1945
Hugh Farie, 1945 to 1959
Robert William Scrymgour Dand, 1960 to 1966
Henry Chatfield-Jude, 1966 to 1976
Victor Andrew Joseph Ravensdale, 1977 to 1984

Chaplains of the Greater Lisbon Chaplaincy
Kenneth William Alfred Roberts, 1984 to 1986
Anthony Hughes Ashdown, 1987 to 1990
John Kenneth Robinson, 1991 to 2000, subsequently Dean of Gibraltar
Michael Bullock OGS, 2000-2012
Nigel Leslie Stimpson, 2013-2014
Frank Sawyer, 2016-2019
Elizabeth Bendry, since 2020

Fincham pipe organ
When the existing church was designed, traditional choir stalls were included in front of the Sanctuary and Henry Fincham of London built and installed a two-manual pipe organ for £526.  It has 25 ranks with 61-note compass of the manuals and 30-note compass of the pedals. There were two minor changes to the Great organ which, in its original state, did not include mutation stops. The organ was restored in 1971.

This is the current disposition of the organ after 125 years of use:

Great – I

8' Open Diapason
8' Lieblich Gedacht
8' Gambe
4' Principal
2' Nazard
2' Fifteenth
1' Tierce
8' Corno de Bassetto
8' Trumpet

Pedal

16' Grande Open Diapason
16' Bourdon

Swell – II

16' Double Open Diapason
8' Horn Diapason
8' Stopped Diapason
8' Vox Angelica
8' Voix Celeste
4' Principal
4' Flûte a Cheminee
2' Fifteenth
III Mixture
8' Cornopean
8' Hautboy
8' Vox Humana
Swell Tremulant
Swell to Great Super
Swell to Great
Swell to Pedal
Great to Pedal
Swell shades open catch mechanism
5 pre-set piston shoes

See also
St James' Church, Porto
St Andrew's Church, Lisbon – Church of Scotland
Estrela Basilica – Roman Catholic church and Carmelite convent nearby

References

External links

Anglican Church of St George and St Paul, Lisbon

Anglican church buildings in Portugal
Churches in Lisbon
Churches completed in 1889
Romanesque Revival church buildings
George Lisbon